The men's bantamweight event was part of the boxing programme at the 1920 Summer Olympics.  The weight class was the second-lightest contested, and allowed boxers of up to 118 pounds (53.5 kilograms). The competition was held from August 21, 1920, to August 24, 1920. Twelve boxers from seven nations competed.

Results

References

Sources
 
 

Bantamweight